General elections were held in Malta on 20 May 1907. All candidates were elected unopposed.

Background
The elections were held under the Chamberlain Constitution, with members elected from eight single-member constituencies.

Results
A total of 7,091 people were registered to vote, but no votes were cast as all candidates were unopposed.

References

1907
Malta
1907 in Malta
Single-candidate elections
Uncontested elections
May 1907 events
1907 elections in the British Empire